Shrapnel is an American military science fiction limited comic book series published by Radical Comics in collaboration with Zombie Studios. The story was created and plotted by Mark Long and Nick Sagan, the final script was written by M. Zachary Sherman, and the art is provided by Bagus Hutomo based on designs by Kai.

Publication history
The first series, Shrapnel: Aristeia Rising, consisting of five issues, ran from January to May 2009. The second series, Shrapnel: Hubris, consisting of three issues, was published in 2010.

Plot synopsis

Aristeia Rising
Aristeia Rising, the first of the three comics, takes place in the "far future" where the "Solar Alliance" has colonized nearly all of the solar system. The Solar Alliance is the dominant presence of humanity and has taken control by force and brutality. A rebellion on Venus, the last free planet, has been formed but is on the brink of losing the war against the Alliance. Samantha “Sam” Vijaya, a war hero who took exile on Venus, soon realizes the threat against the rebels and is faced with the choice of fleeing or helping them to fight back and keep their freedom. She is inevitably forced to team up with the rebels and combat the Alliance. With her previous experience, she teaches them to fight back and leads the uprising against the Solar Alliance.

Collected editions
The series were also published as trade paperbacks published by Radical Comics:
Shrapnel: Aristeia Rising (184 pages, September 15, 2009)
Shrapnel: Hubris (184 pages, 2010)

Film adaptation
In July 2009, Len Wiseman has been attached to direct and produce a film adaptation, but dropped out. Hilary Swank will star and produce the movie with Sean Daniel and Radical Pictures from a script by Toby Wagstaff.

Notes

References

External links
Shrapnel: Aristeia Rising #1-2 review, Ain't It Cool News
Shrapnel: Aristeia Rising Review, Comics Bulletin

Radical Comics titles